Barkhouse Settlement is a rural community on the Eastern Shore of
the Halifax Regional Municipality in the Canadian province of Nova Scotia.

References
Explore HRM

Communities in Halifax, Nova Scotia